Bulee "Slim" Gaillard (January 9, 1911 – February 26, 1991), also known as McVouty, was an American jazz singer and songwriter who played piano, guitar, vibraphone, and tenor saxophone.

Gaillard was noted for his comedic vocalese singing and word play in his own constructed language called "Vout-o-Reenee", for which he wrote a dictionary. In addition to English, he spoke five languages (Spanish, German, Greek, Arabic, and Armenian) with varying degrees of fluency.

He rose to prominence in the late 1930s with hits such as "Flat Foot Floogie (with a Floy Floy)" and "Cement Mixer (Put-Ti-Put-Ti)" after forming Slim and Slam with Leroy Eliot "Slam" Stewart. During World War II, Gaillard served as a bomber pilot in the Pacific. In 1944, he resumed his music career and performed with such notable jazz musicians as Charlie Parker, Dizzy Gillespie, and Dodo Marmarosa.

In the 1960s and 1970s, he acted in films—sometimes as himself—and also appeared in bit parts in television series such as Roots: The Next Generations.

In the 1980s, Gaillard resumed touring the circuit of European jazz festivals. He followed Dizzy Gillespie's advice to move to Europe and, in 1983, settled in London, where he died of cancer on February 26, 1991, after a long career in music, film and television, spanning nearly six decades.

Early life
Along with Gaillard's date of birth, his lineage and place of birth are disputed. Many sources state that he was born in Detroit, Michigan, though he said that he was born in Santa Clara, Cuba, of an Afro-Cuban mother called Maria (Mary Gaillard) and a German-Jewish father called Theophilus (Theophilus Rothschild) who worked as a ship's steward.

During an interview in 1989, Gaillard added: "They all think I was born in Detroit because that was the first place I got into when I got to America." However, the 1920 census lists one "Beuler Gillard" as living in Pensacola, Florida, having been born in April 1918 in Alabama. Researchers Bob Eagle and Eric LeBlanc have concluded that he was born in June 1918 in Claiborne, Alabama, where a "Theophilus Rothchild" had been raised the son of a successful merchant in the small town of Burnt Corn; other documents give his name as Wilson, Bulee, or Beuler Gillard or Gaillard.

At the age of twelve, he accompanied his father on a world voyage and was accidentally left behind on the island of Crete. On a television documentary in 1989, he said, "When I was stranded in Crete, I was only twelve years old. I stayed there for four years. I traveled on the boats to Beirut and Syria and I learned to speak the language and the people's way of life." After learning a few words of Greek, he worked on the island "making shoes and hats". He then joined a ship working the eastern Mediterranean ports, mainly Beirut, where he picked up some knowledge of Arabic. When he was about 15, he re-crossed the Atlantic, hoping the ship would take him home to Cuba, but it was bound for the U.S. and he ended up in Detroit. He never saw either of his parents again.

Alone and unable to speak English, he tried to get a job at Ford Motor Company but was rejected because of his age. He worked at a general store owned by an Armenian family, with whom he lived for some time, then tried to become a boxer. During Prohibition in 1931 or 1932, he drove a hearse with a coffin that was packed with whiskey for the Purple Gang. He attended evening classes in music and taught himself to play guitar and piano. When Duke Ellington came to Detroit, he went backstage and met his hero. Determined to become a musical entertainer, he moved to New York City and entered the world of show business as a "professional amateur". As Gaillard recalled much later:

Career
Gaillard first rose to prominence in the late 1930s as part of Slim & Slam, a jazz novelty act he formed with bassist Slam Stewart. Their hits included "Flat Foot Floogie (with a Floy Floy)", "Cement Mixer (Put-Ti-Put-Ti)" and the hipster anthem "The Groove Juice Special (Opera in Vout)". The duo performs in the 1941 movie Hellzapoppin'.

Gaillard's appeal was similar to Cab Calloway's and Louis Jordan's in that he presented a hip style with broad appeal (for example in his children's song "Down by the Station"). Unlike them, he was a master improviser whose stream of consciousness vocals ranged far from the original lyrics. He sang wild interpolations of nonsense syllables, such as "MacVoutie O-reeney". One such performance is celebrated in the 1957 novel On the Road by Jack Kerouac. Gaillard, with Dodo Marmarosa on piano, appeared as a guest several times on Command Performance, recorded at KNX radio studios in Hollywood in the 1940s and distributed on transcription discs to American troops in World War II.

In 1943, Gaillard was drafted in the United States Army Air Forces and "qualified as a pilot flying [...] B-26 bombers in the Pacific" and resumed his music career on his release from the draft in 1944. Upon his return he released the song "Atomic Cocktail", which featured seemingly lighthearted lyrics laced with symbolism about nuclear war.

Gaillard later teamed with bassist Bam Brown. They can be seen in a 1947 motion picture featurette O'Voutie O'Rooney filmed live at one of their nightclub performances. Slim and Bam was featured at the first Cavalcade of Jazz concert held at Wrigley Field in Los Angeles that was produced by Leon Hefflin Sr. on September 23, 1945, along with Count Basie. Gaillard also played for the 2nd Cavalcade of Jazz held at Wrigley Field on October 12, 1946, and played for the 3rd Cavalcade of Jazz held also at Wrigley Field on September 7, 1947.

In the late 1940s and early 1950s, Gaillard frequently opened at Birdland for Charlie Parker, Flip Phillips, and Coleman Hawkins. His December 1945 session with Parker and Dizzy Gillespie is notable, both musically and for its relaxed convivial air. "Slim's Jam", from that session, is one of the earliest known recordings of Parker's speaking voice.  In 1949 he was playing in San Francisco.  Near the end of Part Two of Jack Kerouac's book On the Road is an account of meeting him at a performance there.

Gaillard could play several instruments and managed to turn the performance from jazz to comedy. He would play the guitar with his left hand fretting with fingers pointing down over the fingerboard (instead of the usual way up from under it), or would play credible piano solos with his palms facing up. Gaillard wrote the theme song to the Peter Potter radio show. In addition, in 1950 he wrote and recorded the "Don Pitts On the Air" theme for San Francisco DJ Don Pitts. On March 27, 2008, the Pitts theme song entered the archives of the Rock and Roll Hall of Fame in Cleveland, Ohio.

In the early 1960s, Gaillard lived in San Diego, California. During that time he recorded several singles and performed with local bands. Under the name Slim Delgado, he recorded a rock and roll single for the Xavier label titled "Frank Rhoads Round" The B-side is a song called "Dr. Free".

Gaillard appeared in several shows in the 1960s and 1970s, including Marcus Welby, M.D., Charlie's Angels, Mission: Impossible, Medical Center, The Flip Wilson Show, and Then Came Bronson. He also appeared in the 1970s TV series Roots: The Next Generations and reprised some of his old hits on the NBC prime-time variety program The Chuck Barris Rah Rah Show.

By the early 1980s Gaillard was touring the European jazz festival circuit, playing with such musicians as Arnett Cobb. He also played with George Melly and John Chilton's Feetwarmers, appearing on their BBC television series and also occasionally deputising for Melly when he was unwell. Gaillard's behavior on stage was often erratic and nerve-wracking for the accompanying musicians. He made a guest appearance on Show 106 of the 1980s music program Night Music, an NBC late-night music series hosted by David Sanborn.

Around Christmas 1985, Gaillard recorded the album Siboney at Gateway Studios in Battersea, London, produced by Joe Massot. As Massot recalled later:
 In 1986, Gaillard appeared in the musical film Absolute Beginners, singing "Selling Out". In the autumn of 1989, the BBC aired director Anthony Wall's four-part documentary on Gaillard entitled Slim Gaillard's Civilisation.

Languages used in songs
Gaillard used Yiddish in at least two of his songs, "Dunkin' Bagels", and "Matzo Balls", where he refers to numerous Jewish ethnic dishes eaten by Ashkenazi Jews. The songs were issued by the Slim Gaillard Quartet in 1945 on the Melodisc label, featuring Gaillard on guitar, Zutty Singleton on drums, "Tiny" Brown on bass and Dodo Marmarosa on piano. "Dunkin Bagels" was later included in the 2010 compilation CD Black Sabbath: The Secret Musical History of Black-Jewish Relations, issued by the Idelsohn Society for Musical Preservation.

He made a cover version of a Greek folk song called "Tee say malee" ("Why Do You Care"). Arabic is used in some of Gaillard's songs, for example "Yep-Roc-Heresy" and "Arabian Boogie". Irish is present in the name O'Voutie O'Rooney, the title of his 1947 movie and reminiscent of Vout-o-Reenee, the name he used for his invented language.

Discography
 Mish Mash (Mercury, 1953)
 Opera in Vout/Boogie Woogie at the Philharmonic with Meade Lux Lewis (Clef, 1953)
 Slim Gaillard Cavorts (Clef, 1953)
 Smorgasbord...Help Your Self (Verve, 1956)
 Slim Gaillard with Dizzie Gillespie and Orchestra (Halo, 1957)
 Slim Gaillard Rides Again! (Dot, 1959)
 Central Avenue Breakdown Volume 2 with Teddy Edwards, Barney Kessel (Onyx, 1974)
 At Birdland (Hep, 1979)
 The Voutest! (Hep, 1982)
 Anytime, Anyplace, Anywhere! with Buddy Tate, Jay McShann (Hep, 1983)
 Roots of Vouty (Putti Putti Music, 1983)
 Steve Allen's Hip Fables with Al Jazzbeaux Collins (Doctor Jazz, 1983)
 Cement Mixer Put-Ti Put-Ti (Folklyric, 1984)
 Live at Ronnie Scott's London (DRG, 1986)
 Siboney (Trojan World, 1991)

Filmography

Film
 Hellzapoppin' (1941) - Specialty
 Almost Married (1942) - Specialty Act
 Sweetheart of Sigma Chi (1946) - And His Trio
 O'Voutie O'Rooney (1947) - Himself
 Stairway for a Star (1947) - Slim Gaillard
 Go, Man, Go! (1954) - Himself
 Too Late Blues (1961) - Piano Player / Party Singer (uncredited)
 Planet of the Apes (1968)
 The Curious Female (1970) - Lushcomb
 Willie Dynamite (1974) - Bum watching Willie's Car (uncredited)
 Absolute Beginners (1986) - Party Singer
 Sky Bandits (1986) - Organ player (final film role)

Television
 Mission Impossible (1966–1973)
 Marcus Welby, M.D. (1969–1976) - Odie Langston
 Medical Center (1969–1976) - Piano Player
 Then Came Bronson (1969–1970) - Bollie Wallace
 Flip (The Flip Wilson Show) (1970–1974)
 Charlie's Angels (1976–1981)
 The Chuck Barris Rah Rah Show (February–April 1978)
 Roots: The Next Generations (February 18–24, 1979) - Sam Wesley
 What's Happening!! (March 16, 1979) - Al
 Love's Savage Fury (May 20, 1979) - Moss

Documentary
 Arena Special, Slim Gaillard's Civilisation (1989):
 "A Traveller's Tale" (52:51), on October 22, 1989
 "How High the Moon" (60:50), on October 29, 1989
 "My Dinner with Dizzy" (59:59), on November 5, 1989
 "Everything's OK in the UK" (54:40), on November 12, 1989
 The Small Black Groups (2003)

References

1910s births
1991 deaths
20th-century American guitarists
20th-century American male musicians
20th-century American pianists
20th-century American singers
American jazz guitarists
American jazz pianists
American jazz singers
American jazz songwriters
American male guitarists
American male jazz musicians
American male pianists
Guitarists from Detroit
Hep Records artists
Jazz musicians from Michigan
People from Villa Clara Province
Scat singers
Slim & Slam members
Swing guitarists
Swing pianists
Swing singers
Verve Records artists
Vocalese singers